The 2019–20 season is Maccabi Haifa's 62nd season in Israeli Premier League, and their 38th consecutive season in the top division of Israeli football.

Club

Squad information

Current coaching staff
{|class="wikitable"
|+
! style="background-color:#FFFFFF; color:#000000;" scope="col"|Position
! style="background-color:#FFFFFF; color:#000000;" scope="col"|Staff
|-

Kits

 Provider: Nike
 Main Sponsor: Volvo
 Secondary Sponsor:  Traffilog, Variety Israel and Hertz

Transfers

In

Out

Pre-season and friendlies

Competitions

Overview

Updated as of 8 July 2020

Ligat Ha'Al

Regular season

Regular season table

Results overview

Play-off

Championship round table

Results overview

Results summary

Results by round

State Cup

Round of 32

Round of 16

Quarter-final

Toto Cup

UEFA qualifiers match

7-8th classification match

UEFA Europa League

First qualifying round

Second qualifying round

Statistics

Squad statistics

Updated on 18 July 2020

Goals

Updated on 8 July 2020

Assists

Updated on 8 July 2020

Clean sheets

Updated on 25 June 2020

Disciplinary record (Ligat Ha'Al and State Cup)

Updated on 8 July 2020

Suspensions

Updated on 5 June 2020

Penalties

Updated on 21 June 2020

Overall

{|class="wikitable" style="text-align: center;"
|-
!
!Total
!Home
!Away
|-
|align=left| Games played          || 44 || 22 || 22
|-
|align=left| Games won             || 29 || 13 || 16
|- 
|align=left| Games drawn          || 6 || 4 || 2
|-
|align=left| Games lost            || 9 || 5 || 4
|-
|align=left| Biggest win             || 5-0 vs Hapoel Tel Aviv ||  5-0 vs Hapoel Tel Aviv || 3-0 vs Sektzia Nes Tziona 3-0 Hapoel Kfar Saba 3-0 vs Hapoel Hadera 4-1 vs Hapoel Haifa 
|-
|align=left| Biggest loss       || 1-3 vs Strasbourg || 0-1 vs Hapoel Be'er Sheva 3-4 vs Maccabi Tel Aviv 0-1 vs Hapoel Kfar Saba 1-2 vs Hapoel Be'er Sheva 1-2 vs Hapoel Tel Aviv || 1-3 vs Strasbourg 0-2 vs Maccabi Tel Aviv 
|-
|align=left| Biggest win (League)    ||  5-0 vs Hapoel Tel Aviv ||  5-0 vs Hapoel Tel Aviv || 3-0 vs Sektzia Nes Tziona 3-0 vs Hapoel Kfar Saba 3-0 vs Hapoel Hadera  4-1 vs Hapoel Haifa 
|-
|align=left| Biggest loss (League)   || 0-2 vs Beitar Jerusalem 0-2 vs Maccabi Tel Aviv || 3-4 vs Maccabi Tel Aviv 0-1 vs Hapoel Kfar Saba vs Hapoel Tel Aviv || 0-2 vs Beitar Jerusalem 0-2 vs Maccabi Tel Aviv 
|-
|align=left| Biggest win (Cup)    || 3-1 vs Sektzia Nes Tziona || 3-1 vs Sektzia Nes Tziona || 1-0 vs Hapoel Umm al-Fahm 
|-
|align=left| Biggest loss (Cup)     || 1-2 vs Hapoel Be'er Sheva || 1-2 vs Hapoel Be'er Sheva ||
|-
|align=left| Biggest win (Toto)    || 2-1 vs Maccabi Netanya || - || 2-1 vs Maccabi Netanya 
|-
|align=left| Biggest loss (Toto)   || 0-1 vs Hapoel Be'er Sheva || 0-1 vs Hapoel Be'er Sheva || - 
|-
|align=left| Biggest win (Europe)     || 2-0 vs Mura || 2-0 vs Mura || 3-2 vs Mura 
|-
|align=left| Biggest loss (Europe)   || 1-3 vs Strasbourg || - || 1-3 vs Strasbourg 
|-
|align=left| Goals scored           || 86 || 49 || 37  
|-
|align=left| Goals conceded         || 40 || 24 || 17
|-
|align=left| Goal difference        || +46 || +16 || +20 
|-
|align=left| Clean sheets           || 18 || 9 || 9
|-
|-
|-
|align=left| Yellow cards          || 86 || 40 || 46
|-
|align=left| Red cards              || 2 || 0 || 2
|-
|align=left| Most appearances      ||colspan=3|  Nikita Rukavytsya (44)
|-
|align=left| Most minutes played   || colspan=3|  Neta Lavi (3,988)
|-
|align=left| Most goals        || colspan=3|  Nikita Rukavytsya (24)
|-
|align=left| Most Assist        || colspan=3|  Dolev Haziza (12)
|-
|align=left|Penalties for   || 3 || 1 || 2 
|-
|align=left|Penalties against   || 6 || 4 || 2
|-
|align=left|Penalties saved   || 2 || 1 ||  1
|-
|align=left| Winning rate         || % ||  % || % 
|-

References

External links
 Maccabi Haifa website

Maccabi Haifa F.C. seasons
Maccabi Haifa